Paris Jam Session is a live album by Art Blakey and the Jazz Messengers with guest appearances by Bud Powell and Barney Wilen, recorded at the Théâtre des Champs-Élysées in Paris on 18 December 1959. It was released by Fontana (France) originally, by EmArcy in 1961, and subsequently by Verve on CD as part of their Jazz in Paris series.

Reception

Allmusic gave  the album 4½ stars with Ken Dryden's review stating: "This is one of the essential live dates in Art Blakey's rather extensive discography". The Guardian's John Fordham rated the album 3 stars out of 5, saying, "the heated live-show informality is really stoked by Blakey's elemental (or maybe just mental) drumming and some spine-tingling improvising by the young Wayne Shorter, unintentional reed-squeaks and all".

Track listing
"Dance of the Infidels" (Bud Powell) — 12:26
"Bouncing with Bud" (Gil Fuller, Powell) — 11:38
"The Midget" (Lee Morgan) — 11:06
"A Night in Tunisia" (Dizzy Gillespie, Frank Paparelli) — 7:02

Personnel
Art Blakey – drums
Lee Morgan – trumpet
Barney Wilen – alto sax (tracks 1-2 only)
Wayne Shorter – tenor sax
Bud Powell – piano (tracks 1-2 only)
Walter Davis Jr. – piano (tracks 3-4 only)
Jymie Merritt – bass

References

Hard bop albums
Art Blakey live albums
The Jazz Messengers live albums
1961 live albums
Fontana Records live albums
EmArcy Records live albums
Verve Records live albums